Joseph Philippe Henri Watson (April 24, 1914 — February 1, 1991) was a Canadian professional ice hockey player and coach in the National Hockey League. He played for the Montreal Canadiens and New York Rangers between 1936 and 1948, and coached the Rangers from 1955 to 1960 and the Boston Bruins from 1961 to 1963 He was born in Montreal, Quebec.

Coaching career
Soon after retiring as a player, Watson became a coach. He was head coach of:

New York Rovers QSHL 1948–1949
New York Rovers EHL 1950–1951
Quebec Citadelles QJHL 1951–1952
New York Rangers NHL 1955–56 to 1959–60
Providence Reds AHL 1960–1961
Boston Bruins NHL  1961-1963
Buffalo Bisons AHL 1964–1966
Quebec Aces AHL 1966–1967

Awards and achievements
1940 Stanley Cup championship (New York Rangers)
1944 Stanley Cup championship (Montreal Canadiens)

Legacy
In the 2009 book 100 Ranger Greats, the authors ranked Watson at No. 76 all-time of the 901 New York Rangers who had played during the team's first 82 seasons.

Career statistics

Regular season and playoffs

Coaching record

References

External links

Picture of Phil Watson's Name on the 1940 Stanley Cup Plaque
Picture of Phil Watson's Name on the 1944 Stanley Cup Plaque

1914 births
1991 deaths
Anglophone Quebec people
Boston Bruins coaches
Canadian ice hockey centres
Ice hockey people from Montreal
Montreal Canadiens players
New York Rangers coaches
New York Rangers players
New York Rovers players
Stanley Cup champions
Canadian expatriate ice hockey players in the United States
Canadian ice hockey coaches